Luke Alexander Ashworth (born 4 December 1989) is an English footballer who plays as a centre-back for Ashton United.

Career

Early career
Born in Bolton, Greater Manchester, Ashworth made his professional debut during a loan period at Leyton Orient from his original club Wigan Athletic, in Orient's 4–2 Football League Trophy win against Southend United on 2 September 2008, and his league debut eleven days later. He returned to Wigan on 3 November 2008.

He signed for Leyton Orient on a permanent basis in January 2009, and scored his first professional goal for Orient in the FA Cup first round tie against Tranmere Rovers on 7 November 2009. On 23 June 2010, he left Orient on a free transfer and joined Rotherham United. After his release from Rotherham in the summer of 2011, he played for Harrogate Town between 9 September and 13 December, after which he signed for Halifax in December on a non-contract basis. He left the club in May 2012.

Hyde
After being released from Halifax at the end of the season, he moved up a division to go and play at Conference National newcomers Hyde. He made his debut for the club in the opening game of the 2012–13 season, in a 2–2 draw away at Braintree Town.

In March 2014 he joined Chester on loan until the end of the 2013–14 season, before moving to then-Northern Premier League Premier Division club FC United of Manchester in August 2014.

In July 2017 he joined Stalybridge Celtic.

In July 2018 he rejoined former club FC United of Manchester. In September he moved to Ashton United.

Little Lever Sports Club
In August 2021 Luke signed a contract at Little Lever Sports Club. Whilst originally starting out in the reserve team he was hoping to make a big impact and force his way into the first team. His first appearance was against Jogabola FC scoring 2 goals.

References

External links

1989 births
Living people
Footballers from Bolton
English footballers
Association football defenders
Wigan Athletic F.C. players
Leyton Orient F.C. players
Rotherham United F.C. players
Hyde United F.C. players
Harrogate Town A.F.C. players
FC Halifax Town players
Chester F.C. players
F.C. United of Manchester players
English Football League players
National League (English football) players
Stalybridge Celtic F.C. players
Ashton United F.C. players